This is a list of airlines in Vietnam, as approved by the Civil Aviation Authority of Vietnam (CAAV).

Scheduled airlines

Charter airlines

See also
 List of airlines
 List of defunct airlines of Vietnam
 List of airports in Vietnam
 List of defunct airlines of Asia

References

External links 
 VASCO
 Vietnam Airlines
 Jetstar Pacific Airlines
 Vietjet Air
 Hai Au Aviation

Vietnam
Airlines
Airlines
Vietnam